Caldwellia is a genus of minute, air-breathing land snails, terrestrial pulmonate gastropod mollusks or micromollusks in the family Euconulidae, the hive snails.

Species
Species within the genus Caldwellia include:
 Caldwellia imperfecta
 Caldwellia philyrina

References

 ZipcodeZoo info at 

 
Euconulidae
Taxonomy articles created by Polbot